Cantharini is a tribe of soldier beetles in the family Cantharidae. There are more than 40 genera and over 500 described species in Cantharini.

Genera
These 46 genera belong to the tribe Cantharini:

 Ancistronycha Märkel, 1852
 Armidia Mulsant, 1862
 Atalantycha Kazantsev, 2005
 Bactrocantharis Barovskii, 1926
 Bactronycha Kazantsev, 2001
 Bisadia Wittmer, 1972
 Boveycantharis Wittmer, 1969
 Cantharis Linnaeus, 1758
 Cantharomorphus Fiori, 1914
 Cephalomalthinus Pic, 1921
 Cordicantharis Svihla, 1999
 Cratosilis Motschulsky, 1860
 Cultellunguis McKey-Fender, 1950
 Cyrebion Fairmaire, 1891
 Cyrtomoptera Motschulsky, 1860
 Falsopodabrus Pic, 1927
 Habronychus Wittmer, 1982
 Islamocantharis Wittmer & Magis, 1978
 Leiothorax Pinna, 1974 (decapod)
 Lycocerus Gorham, 1889
 Malchinomorphus Pic, 1922
 Metacantharis Bourgeois, 1886
 Micropodabrus Pic, 1920
 Mimopodabrus Wittmer, 1997
 Occathemus Svihla, 1999
 Pacificanthia Kazantsev, 2001
 Pakabsidia Wittmer, 1972
 Paracantharis Wittmer, 1969
 Podabrinus Fairmaire, 1896
 Podistra Motschulsky, 1839
 Prothemellus Svihla, 1992
 Prothemus Champion, 1926
 Pseudopodabrus Pic, 1906
 Rambesilis Pic, 1911
 Rhagonycha Eschscholtz, 1830
 Rhaxonycha Motschulsky, 1860
 Sidabia Svihla, 1994
 Silicantharis Svihla, 1992
 Sinometa Wittmer, 1969
 Sogdocantharis Kasantsev, 1993
 Stenothemus Bourgeois, 1907
 Taiwanocantharis Wittmer, 1984
 Taocantharis Švihla, 2011
 Themus Motschulsky, 1858
 Walteriella Kazantsev, 2001
 Yukikoa Sato, 1976

References

 Delkeskamp, Kurt (1977). "Cantharidae". Coleopterorum Catalogus Supplementa, pars 165, fasc. 1, 485.

External links

 

Cantharidae
Beetle tribes